Cody Durden (born March 29, 1991) is an American mixed martial artist who competes in the Flyweight division of the Ultimate Fighting Championship.

Background
A 2009 graduate of Eastside High School, he wrestled under coach Michael Smith-Foot, leading the Eagles to two state championships. He compiled a remarkable 121-31 record, winning four area championships, two sectional titles and advanced to the state final as a senior.

He was offered a scholarship to the United States Military Academy in West Point, New York, but due to the arrival of his son, he had start working instead of school. After the invitation of his long-time friend and mixed martial artist Travis Knight to train at a gym, he started training regularly and made his amateur debut in 2014.

While not training, he holds down a day job as a construction worker and is a married father of two.

Mixed martial arts career

Early career
Durden's first bout in 2014 brought him a loss against Francisco Quijada in the amateur National Fighting Championship promotion. Following that loss, Durden went on a five-fight win streak with the NFC, prompting the fighter to move up to a more professional level.

Durden won his first four professional fights, then suffered back-to-back defeats to Jared Scoggins and Ryan Hollis. He would go on to win the next 7 bouts, all via stoppage, winning the VF Bantamweight Championship in the process.

Ultimate Fighting Championship
Durden, as a replacement for Luke Sanders, faced Chris Gutiérrez on August 1, 2020 at UFC Fight Night: Brunson vs. Shahbazyan. The fight ended in draw.

Dropping down to flyweight, Durden faced Jimmy Flick on December 19, 2020 at UFC Fight Night: Thompson vs. Neal. He lost the bout via flying triangle choke in the first round.

Durden faced Aori Qileng on November 20, 2021 at UFC Fight Night: Vieira vs. Tate. He won the bout via unanimous decision.

Durden faced Muhammad Mokaev on March 19, 2022 at UFC Fight Night 204. He lost the fight via guillotine choke in round one.

Durden faced JP Buys on June 25, 2022 at UFC on ESPN 38. He won the fight via technical knockout in the first round.

Durden was expected to face Kleydson Rodrigues on October 29, 2022 at UFC Fight Night: Kattar vs. Allen. However, Rodrigues withdrew from the bout and was replaced by Legacy Fighting Alliance flyweight champion Carlos Mota on four day's notice. Durden won the bout via unanimous decision.

Durden is scheduled to face Charles Johnson on April 29, 2023, at UFC Fight Night 223.

Championships and accomplishments
Valor Fighting Challenge
VF Bantamweight Championship (One time; former)

Mixed martial arts record

|-
|Win
|align=center|14–4–1
|Carlos Mota
|Decision (unanimous)
|UFC Fight Night: Kattar vs. Allen
|
|align=center|3
|align=center|5:00
|Las Vegas, Nevada, United States
|
|-
|Win
|align=center|13–4–1
|JP Buys
|TKO (punches)
|UFC on ESPN: Tsarukyan vs. Gamrot
|
|align=center|1
|align=center|1:08
|Las Vegas, Nevada, United States
|-
|Loss
|align=center|12–4–1
|Muhammad Mokaev
|Submission (guillotine choke)
|UFC Fight Night: Volkov vs. Aspinall
|
|align=center|1
|align=center|0:58
|London, England
|
|-
|Win
|align=center|12–3–1
|Aori Qileng
|Decision (unanimous)
|UFC Fight Night: Vieira vs. Tate
|
|align=center|3
|align=center|5:00
|Las Vegas, Nevada, United States
|
|-
| Loss
| align=center|11–3–1
|Jimmy Flick
|Submission (flying triangle choke)
|UFC Fight Night: Thompson vs. Neal
|
|align=center|1
|align=center|3:18
|Las Vegas, Nevada, United States
|
|-
| Draw
| align=center|11–2–1
|Chris Gutiérrez
|Draw (unanimous)
|UFC Fight Night: Brunson vs. Shahbazyan 
|
|align=center|3
|align=center|5:00
|Las Vegas, Nevada, United States
|
|-
| Win
| align=center| 11–2
| John Sweeney
|TKO
|NFC 125
|
|align=center|1
|align=center|1:20
|Conyers, Georgia, United States
|
|-
| Win
| align=center| 10–2
|Varon Webb
| Submission (rear-naked choke)
|NFC 124
| 
| align=center| 1
| align=center| 3:17
| Atlanta, Georgia, United States
|
|-
| Win
| align=center|9–2
| Dre Miley
|TKO (strikes)
|Valor Fighting Challenge 66
|
|align=center|2
|align=center|4:37
|Knoxville, Tennessee, United States
|
|-
| Win
| align=center|8–2
| Jeremy Rogers
| Submission (armbar)
|Valor Fighting Challenge 59
|
| align=center|1
| align=center|0:59
|Kodak, Tennessee, United States
|
|-
| Win
| align=center|7–2
| Dylan Schulte
|TKO (slam)
|SCL: Army vs Marines 10
|
|align=center|1
|align=center|0:30
|Loveland, Colorado, United States
| 
|-
| Win
| align=center| 6–2
| Todd Monroe
| Submission (armbar)
| 864 Fighting Championship 9
| 
| align=center| 3
| align=center| 4:56
| Duluth, Georgia, United States
|
|-
| Win
| align=center| 5–2
| Todd Monroe
|TKO (punches)
|864 Fighting Championship 5
|
|align=center|1
|align=center|3:15
|Greenville, South Carolina, United States
|
|-
| Loss
| align=center|4–2
|Ryan Hollis
|Submission (rear-naked choke)
|864 Fighting Championship 3
|
|align=center|2
|align=center|3:39
|Greenville, South Carolina, United States
|
|-
| Loss
| align=center|4–1
|Jared Scoggins
|Decision (unanimous)
|NFC 97
|
|align=center|3
|align=center|5:00
|Duluth, Georgia, United States
|
|-
| Win
| align=center| 4–0
| Dave Morgan
|Submission (guillotine choke)
|NFC 92
|
|align=center|1
|align=center|0:39
|Kennesaw, Georgia, United States
|
|-
| Win
| align=center|3–0
| Devante Sewell
|Decision (unanimous)
| NFC 88
|
|align=center|3
|align=center|5:00
|Atlanta, Georgia, United States
|
|-
| Win
| align=center|2–0
| Damarcus Holmes
| Submission (rear-naked choke)
|NFC 85
|
| align=center|1
| align=center|1:01
|Kennesaw, Georgia, United States
|
|-
| Win
| align=center|1–0
| Marcus Levester
| TKO (punches)
|NFC 83
|
|align=center|1
|align=center|1:30
|Atlanta, Georgia, United States
|

See also 
 List of current UFC fighters
 List of male mixed martial artists

References

External links 
  
 

1991 births
Living people
American male mixed martial artists
Flyweight mixed martial artists
Mixed martial artists utilizing wrestling
Ultimate Fighting Championship male fighters
American male sport wrestlers
Amateur wrestlers
People from Covington, Georgia
Mixed martial artists from Georgia (U.S. state)